Noah Davis (September 10, 1818 – March 20, 1902) was an American lawyer and politician from New York.

Life
Davis was born in Haverhill, New Hampshire on September 10, 1818, the son of Noah Davis (1781–1863) and Freelove Crawford (Arnold) Davis. He was the grandson of Jonathan Arnold and the nephew of Lemuel Hastings Arnold. Davis's family moved to Albion, New York in 1825, and he attended Lima Seminary in Buffalo, New York. Then he studied law in Lewiston, New York, was admitted to the bar in 1841, and practiced in Gainesville, New York, and Buffalo. He returned to Albion in February 1844 and practiced law in partnership with Sanford E. Church.

In 1857, he was appointed to the New York Supreme Court (8th District) to fill the vacancy caused by the resignation of James Mullett, and was subsequently elected to two eight-year terms, but resigned in 1868 after his election to Congress. He was ex officio a judge of the New York Court of Appeals in 1865.

Davis was elected as a Republican to the 41st United States Congress, and served from March 4, 1869, to July 15, 1870, when he resigned. Davis was appointed by President Ulysses S. Grant U.S. Attorney for the Southern District of New York and held that office from July 20, 1870, to December 31, 1872, when he resigned.

In November 1872, he was elected to a 14-year term on the New York Supreme Court (1st District). He presided over the trial of William M. Tweed in 1873, whose defense counsel included David Dudley Field II and Elihu Root. After his term expired, he resumed the practice of law in New York City and was a member of the council of the University of the City of New York (now New York University.)

He was buried at Mount Albion Cemetery in Albion.

References

EX-JUSTICE DAVIS DEAD, The New York Times, March 21, 1902
The New York Civil List, compiled by Franklin Benjamin Hough (p. 352; Weed, Parsons and Co., 1858)
Court of Appeals judges

External links
 

1818 births
1902 deaths
People from Haverhill, New Hampshire
William M. Tweed
People from Albion, Orleans County, New York
Politicians from New York City
New York Supreme Court Justices
United States Attorneys for the Southern District of New York
Judges of the New York Court of Appeals
Republican Party members of the United States House of Representatives from New York (state)
People from Gainesville, New York
People from Lewiston, New York
19th-century American politicians
Lawyers from New York City
19th-century American judges